Jump Up! is the sixteenth studio album by English musician Elton John. It was released in 1982 by The Rocket Record Company except in the US and Canada, where it was released by Geffen Records.

Background
The album includes "Empty Garden (Hey Hey Johnny)", a tribute to John Lennon (who had also signed to Geffen for the release of Double Fantasy, which is now owned by EMI). This is one of the first few LPs that showcases John singing in a deeper voice, as can be heard in songs such as "Blue Eyes", "Princess", "Ball and Chain" and "Spiteful Child". "Legal Boys" was written by John and Tim Rice, who later wrote lyrics for The Lion King and The Road to El Dorado. This is the last studio album in which James Newton Howard played keyboards (although he would play keyboards with John again on the soundtrack of Gnomeo & Juliet almost 30 years later).

In a 2010 Sirius radio special, John's lyricist, Bernie Taupin, talking about Jump Up!, said it was "one of our worst albums". He added, "It's a terrible, awful, disposable album, but it had 'Empty Garden' on it, so it's worth it for that one song." In the United States, it was certified gold by the RIAA in November 1982. The album's inner sleeve artwork shows John's lifelong friend Vance Buck and Gary Osborne's then 5-year-old son Luke.

Since 1982, only "Empty Garden" and "Blue Eyes" have been performed live in concert.

Recording
The album was recorded and mixed digitally at AIR Studios in Montserrat, and Pathe Marconi Studios in France.

Track listing

Notes
Previously available since 1983 on CD in Europe on the Rocket/Phonogram label, in 2003, John's company, Rocket, in association with Mercury/Universal Records, reissued the album on CD, remastered by Gary Moore. It had no bonus tracks but did include many new and previously released photographs of John during the early 1980s, full lyrics and snapshots of the cover art for the album's singles, along with liner notes by John Tobler.

Two slightly different covers exist.

Outtakes
Outtakes from Jump Up! include "At This Time in My Life", "Desperation Train", "I'm Not Very Well", "Jerry's Law", "Moral Majority", "Waking Up in Europe" and "The Ace of Hearts and the Jack of Spades". They all have yet to see circulation, either on bootlegs or officially.

However, "Desperation Train" was later recorded and released by John's lyricist Bernie Taupin on his 1987 album, Tribe, with a new melody written by Martin Page.

Personnel 
 Elton John – lead vocals, backing vocals, acoustic piano, electric grand piano, harpsichord on "Empty Garden"
 James Newton Howard – Fender Rhodes, synthesizers, brass and string arrangements, conductor 
 Richie Zito – guitars
 Pete Townshend – acoustic guitar on "Ball and Chain"
 Dee Murray – bass, backing vocals
 Jeff Porcaro – drums, percussion
 Steve Holley – tambourine on "Ball and Chain", synth drum on "I Am Your Robot"
 Martyn Ford (billed in the credits as "Mountain Fjord") – brass and orchestra
 Gavyn Wright – concertmaster 
 Gary Osborne – backing vocals

Production 
 Produced by Chris Thomas
 Recorded by Bill Price
 Assistant Engineers – Nigel Barker and Mike Stavrou
 Mastered by Greg Fulginiti at Artisan Sound Recorders (Hollywood, CA).
 A&R – John Kalodner
 Design – David Costa
 Photography – David Nutter

Charts

Weekly charts

Year-end charts

Certifications

References

External links

1982 albums
Elton John albums
Albums produced by Chris Thomas (record producer)
Geffen Records albums
The Rocket Record Company albums
Albums recorded at AIR Studios